Jan Sokol may refer to:
Jan Sokol of Lamberk (c.1355–1410), Moravian nobleman
Jan Sokol (philosopher) (1936–2021), Czech philosopher 
Ján Sokol (bishop) (born 1933), Slovak archbishop and priest
Ján Sokol (footballer) (born 1985), Slovak football striker
Jan Sokol (cyclist) (born 1990), Austrian cyclist